Evangelos "Vangelis" Angelou (alternate spelling: Vaggelis Aggelou) (born November 11, 1962 in Chalkida, Greece), is a Greek retired professional basketball player and current professional basketball coach. At  in height, Angelou played at the point guard position.

Professional playing career
Angelou began playing basketball with the youth teams of AGE Chalkida. In his pro playing career, Angelou played with Apollon Patras, Olympiacos, Panionios, and Iraklis. He scored 1,782 points in 254 games played in the Greek League. He also played in the FIBA Korać Cup with Olympiacos and Panionios, and in the FIBA EuroLeague with Iraklis.

Coaching career
Angelou began his coaching career with AGE Chalkida from 1996–2002, where he led the club from the lower categories of Greek basketball up to the Greek 2nd Division. He then worked as an assistant coach under Milan Minić at Aris in the 2002–03 season. He then moved to Maroussi, where he was an assistant coach under Panagiotis Giannakis, from 2003–2005. After that, he moved to Dynamo Moscow, where he was Dušan Ivković's assistant from 2005–2007.

He was named the head coach of AEK Athens on November 7, 2007, and remained the team's head coach for the 2007–08 season. He was then the head coach of Trikala 2000 in the 2008–09 season. After coaching Trikala, he once again worked as Ivković's assistant, this time at Olympiacos, from 2010–2012. He then became the head coach of Aris in 2012.

He then became the head coach of Efes in December 2013, and then worked as an assistant with Efes. He became the head coach of the Greek club Promitheas Patras in December 2016. He became Aris' head coach again, in 2018.

Personal life
Angelou's son, Georgios, is a professional basketball player, and played under Angelou, while he was the head coach of Aris.His brother Argyris is a famous Greek actor.

Awards and accomplishments

Assistant coach
EuroCup Champion: (2006)
Greek Cup Winner: (2011)
EuroLeague Champion: (2012)
Greek League Champion: (2012)

References

External links
FIBA EuroLeague Player Profile
EuroLeague Coach Profile
FCM Profile
Aris Coach Profile
Olympiacos Coach Profile

1962 births
Living people
AEK B.C. coaches
AGEH Gymnastikos B.C. coaches
Anadolu Efes S.K. coaches
Apollon Patras B.C. players
Aris B.C. coaches
ASK Karditsas B.C. coaches
Basketbol Süper Ligi head coaches
Greek basketball coaches
Greek men's basketball players
Ionikos Nikaias B.C. coaches
Iraklis Thessaloniki B.C. players
Larisa B.C. coaches
Olympiacos B.C. players
Panionios B.C. players
Point guards
Promitheas Patras B.C. coaches
Trikala B.C. coaches
Zamalek SC basketball coaches
Sportspeople from Chalcis